William Wilson Taft (born September 15, 1932) is a former member of the Ohio Senate, and a member of the prominent Taft family.  From Cleveland, he served the 26th District, which was based out of far eastern Cuyahoga County.  He served from 1967 to 1972, when he was replaced by Anice Johnson. Taft also served as a member of the board of trustees for Cleveland State University

References

1932 births
Living people
Republican Party Ohio state senators
Politicians from Cleveland
Cleveland State University people
Taft family
Amherst College alumni
Harvard Law School alumni